The Lausanne Covenant is a July 1974 religious manifesto promoting active worldwide Christian evangelism. One of the most influential documents in modern evangelicalism, it was written at the First International Congress on World Evangelization in Lausanne, Switzerland, where it was adopted by 2,300 evangelicals in attendance.

History
In July 1974, the original Lausanne conference brought together approximately 2,700 Christian religious leaders from over 150 countries and was called by a committee headed by the American evangelist Billy Graham. The drafting committee for the 15-point document was chaired by John Stott of the United Kingdom. In addition to the signing of the covenant, the conference also created the Lausanne Committee for World Evangelization. The covenant is in the form of an ecumenical confession, in which the signatories profess their shame at having failed to spread the Gospel of Jesus. The covenant specifically affirms the beliefs in the Nicene Creed. The signatories express their intention to be more committed to spreading Christianity throughout the world.

The original document is in English and has been translated into at least twenty different languages. In 1989, fifteen years after the original Lausanne conference, the Second International Congress on World Evangelization (sometimes called "Lausanne II") convened in Manila, Philippines, and adopted the Manila Manifesto, an elaboration of the Lausanne Covenant.

The introduction of the covenant is:

References

Bibliography

Further reading

External links

Text of the Lausanne Covenant

1974 documents
1974 in Christianity
Christian missions
Evangelical documents
Manifestos
July 1974 events in Europe